Bridgewater is the name of both a town in New York State and a village within that town:
Bridgewater (town), New York
Bridgewater (village), New York.